Annona cubensis is a species of Annona endemic to Cuba.

References

Flora of Cuba
cubensis